The 2009 Northwest Missouri State Bearcats football team was an American football team that won the 2009 NCAA Division II national championship. 

The team represented Northwest Missouri State University in the Mid-America Intercollegiate Athletics Association (MIAA) during the 2009 NCAA Division II football season. In their 16th season under head coach Mel Tjeerdsma, the Bearcats compiled a 14–1 record (9–0 against conference opponents) and won the MIAA championship. The team lost the season opener to Abilene Christian and then won 14 consecutive games. The 2009 Bearcats averaged 42 points and 632 yards of offense per game.

The team advanced to the NCAA Division II playoffs and won the national championship by defeating Grand Valley State, 30–23, in the championship game.

The Bearcats' statistical leaders included LaRon Council with 1,819 rushing yards,  Blake Bolles with 4,146 passing yards, Jake Soy with 1,559 receiving yards and 162 points scored.

The team played its home games at Bearcat Stadium in Maryville, Missouri.

Schedule

References

Northwest Missouri
Northwest Missouri State Bearcats football seasons
NCAA Division II Football Champions
Mid-America Intercollegiate Athletics Association football champion seasons
Northwest Missouri State Bearcats football